Jalan Sungai Lembing, Federal Route 231 (formerly Pahang State Route C4), is a major highway in Kuantan, Pahang, Malaysia. It is also a main route to East Coast Expressway via Kuantan Interchange. The Kilometre Zero of the Federal Route 231 starts at Kuantan.

At most sections, the Federal Route 231 was built under the JKR R5 road standard, allowing maximum speed limit of up to 90 km/h.

List of junctions

References

Highways in Malaysia
Malaysian Federal Roads